Mei Yi can refer to:

Mei Ze ( 4th century), Jin dynasty official and Confucian scholar
Moy Yat (1938–2001), Chinese martial artist